Justice Arup Kumar Goswami (born 11 March 1961) is an Indian Judge. He is the former Chief Justice of Chhattisgarh High Court, Andhra Pradesh High Court and Sikkim High Court and Judge of Gauhati High Court.

Career
Graduated in Economics (Hons.) from Cotton College under Gauhati University in 1981. Obtained LL.B. Degree from Government Law College, Guwahati in 1985. Enrolled as an Advocate with the Bar Council of Assam, Nagaland, Meghalaya, Manipur, Tripura, Mizoram and Arunachal Pradesh on 16 August 1985. Practiced mainly on the Civil, Criminal, Constitutional and Service matters.

Was designated as Senior Advocate by the Gauhati High Court on 21 December 2004.

Was Standing Counsel of the Gauhati High Court, Karbi-Anglong Autonomous Council and North Cachar Hills Autonomous Council. Had also been a Senior Standing Counsel, Education Department, Government of Assam.

After that he was appointed an Additional Judge of the Gauhati High Court on 24 January 2011 and became a permanent Judge w.e.f. 7 November 2012.

Was the Executive Chairman of Nagaland State Legal Services Authority from 1 April 2011 to 12 August 2013.

Was the Executive Chairman of Assam State Legal Services Authority from 6 June 2018 to 14 October 2019 and the Executive Chairman of Arunachal Pradesh State Legal Services Authority from 8 March 2016 to 14 October 2019.

Was Chief Justice (Acting) of the Gauhati High Court from 6 September 2018 to 29 October 2018 and also from 24 May 2019 to 6 October 2019.

Was Editor of ATMAN, a Biannual News Bulletin of the Gauhati High Court, from October 2018 to 14 October 2019.

Was the Secretary General of the Gauhati High Court Bar Association for the period 2000-2001.

Represented Assam in Ranji Trophy. Also represented East Zone in Under-19, Under-22 and at the senior level.

On 15 October 2019, Hon’ble Justice Arup Kumar Goswami had sworn in as the new Chief Justice of High Court of Sikkim. Hon’ble Governor Shri Ganga Prasad administered him the oath at the lawn of New Raj Bhawan.

The swearing-in ceremony was attended by Hon’ble Chief Minister P. S. Tamang (Golay), Hon’ble Justice Meenakshi Madan Rai, Hon’ble Justice Bhaskar Raj Pradhan, Hon’ble Cabinet Ministers, Hon’ble Member of Lok Sabha, Indra Hang Subba, Hon’ble Members of Sikkim Legislative Assembly, Registrar General, Chief Secretary of Sikkim, Additional Chief Secretaries, Additional Registrar General, Senior government officers, Advisors to Government of Sikkim, Law fraternity members of High Court of Sikkim and Sikkim State Legal Service Authority and host of dignitaries.

After retirement of Justice Vijay Kumar Bist in the month of September, the post of Chief Justice of High Court of Sikkim had fallen vacant after the superannuation of Justice Vijai Kumar Bist on 16 September 2019. And on 15 October 2019, Hon'ble Justice Arup Goswami was appointed a New Chief justice of Sikkim High Court.

He was transferred as Chief Justice of Andhra Pradesh High Court on 31 December 2020 and took oath on 6 January 2021.

He was transferred as Chief Justice of Chhattisgarh High Court on 9 October 2021 and took oath on 12 October 2021.

He was retired on 10 March 2023.

References 

Living people
Indian judges
1961 births
Chief Justices of the Andhra Pradesh High Court